Mohamed Hany Gamal El-Demerdash (born 25 January 1996), is an Egyptian footballer who plays for Egyptian Premier League side Al Ahly and the Egyptian national team as a right-back.

International Statistics
''Statistics accurate as of match played 25 March 2021.

Honours

Al Ahly

 Egyptian Premier League: 2015–16, 2016–17, 2017–18, 2018–19, 2019–20
 Egypt Cup: 2016–17, 2019–20
 Egyptian Super Cup: 2017, 2018
 CAF Champions League: 2019–20, 2020-21
 CAF Super Cup: 2021 (May), 2021 (December)
 FIFA Club World Cup: Third-Place 2020, Third-Place 2021

References

1996 births
Living people
Footballers from Cairo
Egyptian footballers
Egypt youth international footballers
Egypt international footballers
Association football fullbacks
Egyptian Premier League players
2015 Africa U-23 Cup of Nations players
Al Ahly SC players